Marlene McCarty is a multidisciplinary artist and activist based in New York. She was a member of the AIDS collective Gran Fury, and co-founded the trans-disciplinary design studio Bureau. Using everyday materials such as graphite, ballpoint pen, and highlighter McCarty creates mural sized drawings related to issues ranging from sexual and social formation, gender and power, to parricide and infanticide.

Early life and education 

McCarty was born in 1957 and raised in Lexington, Kentucky. After graduating from Sayre School, McCarty attended the University of Cincinnati College of Design Architecture, Art, and Planning (1975- 1977) before studying in Basel Switzerland at Schule fur Gestaltung Basel (1978 - 1983). At Schule fur Gestaltung Basel McCarty majored in design. During the early 1980s in Basel, McCarty did scenic installations for Punk and New Wave bands at Kulturhaus Palazzo in Leistal.

Career

Gran Fury
After graduating from Basel in 1983, McCarty moved to New York City's East Village to become an artist. In 1987, while working at M&Co as a designer, McCarty became a member of the AIDS activist art collective Gran Fury. Gran Fury fought to affect AIDS policies, staging numerous public AIDS activist interventions. Their goal was to spread information about AIDS at a time when the government was not speaking on this issue. Through speaking to the press, conducting workshops, symposia or giving presentations with students, Gran Fury spread AIDS information rousing people to action.

Their major projects include The Government Has Blood on Its Hands, an action at FDA headquarters in Washington, D.C. which protested federal policies concerning AIDS drugs, drug trials, and access to drugs. Kissing Doesn’t Kill was an appropriation of a Benetton Ad showing a diverse group of same sex, interracial, and heterosexual couples kissing, which was plastered on city buses across America countering the public fear that kissing transmitted AIDS.

In January 2012, the first historical survey of Gran Fury’s world-renowned work opened at the NYU Steinhardt 80WSE gallery. The collective’s work is archived at the Whitney Museum of American Art and New York Public Library.

Bureau 1989-2001 

In 1989, McCarty co-founded Bureau with artist Donald Moffett. Bureau was a “trans-disciplinary design studio”   whose mandate was to produce art, film titles, political work, and commercial work. Bureau worked with clients as diverse as Calvin Klein, Sundance, Channel, HBO, Amazon and more. In 2014, Bureau received the Visual AIDS Vanguard Award.

Metro Pictures Gallery, 1990's 

McCarty landed her first exhibit, Shut Up You Shut Up, at Wessel O-Conner Gallery in 1990. Her early works were large text paintings featuring words such as "Slash" and "Snatch" in a highly stylized typeface, or single phrases such as "I may not go down in history but I may go down on your little sister," and "You're my slut bottom suck."  McCarty used found language, appropriating the sexist speech she heard from street harassers and catcallers or that she saw in graffiti. The text was hand drawn and ironed onto T-shirt material which was used as the canvas. The iron-on process of T-shirt transfers was a symbolic resistance to the male dominated art world.

In 1991 McCarty joined Metro Pictures Gallery. The works went on to show in exhibitions across the US and Europe accompanied by a catalogue, Die Neoantigen (The Nineties) in 1994 at the Vienna Secession in Austria

Poltergeist, Girls at Home/ The “murder girls” series, 1995–2014 

McCarty started research for what was to become her most famous body of work, the “murder girls” series or “Poltergeist, Girls at Home,”  a series of mural sized portraits made with graphite pencil and ball-point pen. Each portrait is based on a true crime case of teenage girls who murdered their mothers, parental figures or in some instances girls who had been murdered by their mothers. McCarty unearthed 42 cases through research.

At the time McCarty tried iron-on portraits using the girls' photographs but found the final effect to look like “Warhol wannabes” that were more about production and manufacturing than about the girls themselves. Her mother asked her to return home to Kentucky to clear out a closet of her old belongings. Here McCarty found a self-portrait she had drawn as a teenager. In finding this moody adolescent rendition she realized that she would use the medium of drawing, associated with grade-school notebook doodles, to represent the girls.

In McCarty's portraits the girls are wearing see-through clothes revealing nipples, breasts and vulvas. McCarty wanted to draw attention to the changing social expectations of the girls as they transitioned from girlhood to womanhood taking on a new sexual currency in society. McCarty took great care to distinguish the work from sensationalist true crime tales including a written addendum with each portrait that combined touching details of the girls lives with descriptions of the murders they committed. The addendums gave context to the drawings, she says “if you didn't know anything you see a teenage girl with see through clothes.”  McCarty planned on documenting all cases she found within her lifetime but due to the birth of social media and subsequent loss of privacy controls McCarty is no longer making these works. She views the drawings as intimate and contextual and has no interest in the work being disseminated to millions via social media.

Due to the challenging subject matter it took a long time for the portraits to be absorbed by the art world. Metro Pictures did not want to show the series, like most curators they found the work too challenging for the times.  In an interview for The Believer, McCarty related the girls’ experiences with those of the general public saying, “I think the struggles that these girls are fighting with, I think they are not foreign to the vast majority of us but we don't cross that boundary” subsequently the interview was removed as it was going to press.

From painting to drawing 

The “murder girls” series marks an important moment in McCarty's artistic practice as it solidified her commitment to drawing and shift from text paintings. A change which McCarty herself didn't foresee, she says, “if you'd told me a year before I started the murder girls that I would have been doing figurative drawings I would have told you that you were out of your mind” but after completing the “murder girls” series she was unable to stop drawing.  Often seen as a secondary art form it was drawing's association with the low-brow and its position beyond “mastership” and “master” that attracted McCarty. Most specifically, McCarty draws with a blue ballpoint pen,  the same thing high-school girls use for their homework or for “doodling on their notebooks,” and it is the preferred tool for “primate fieldwork.”   Although McCarty finds the medium physically demanding, as the pressure required to keep the ink flowing when drawing on the wall can cause shoulder injuries, she continues to work with ballpoint pen and graphite producing monumental works that speak to social and sexual inequality, the role of women, interspecies relationships and trans biology.

Guggenheim Fellowship 

In 2003, McCarty received a Guggenheim Fellowship  to research a 3D immersive project, Bad Blood. Bad Blood was an interactive sculpture based on Marlene Olive from McCarty's “murder girls” series. The installation was to use 3D technology. McCarty traveled the world speaking with experts, leading workshops at Hyper Werk Institute for Postindustrial Design in Basel, Switzerland as well as the ETH in Zurich. The project was awarded additional grants from The American Center Foundation and the Site mapping / Bundesamt für Kultur Schweiz grant for technology, but technology was not as developed as it is today, and the finances required to accomplish the project proved prohibitive.

American Fine Arts Gallery and Sikkema  

In the early two thousands, McCarty moved to Soho galleries American Fine Arts Gallery run by Colin de Lande and the Bronwyn Keenan Gallery. Both galleries presented poltergeist girls at home in 2002. The exhibit at Bronwyn Keenan Gallery, Young Americans, Part 2, featured McCarty's newer multi figure drawings. One drawing was inspired by an Indiana crime case where four girls murdered a schoolmate because she was having an affair with another girl's female lover.  The “murder girl” series was then exhibited in venues such as the Kunst Halle St. Gallen in Switzerland and the Museum Ludwig in Germany. Cycles of mural size drawings from this body of work were most prominently exhibited at the Istanbul Biennial and the Busan Biennale and reside in collections at the Museum of Modern Art and the Museum of Contemporary Art, Los Angeles

In 2005 the Brent Sikkema Gallery, which is now known as Sikkema, Jenkins & Co. began representing McCarty's work. In 2008 McCarty presented a major body of work under the exhibition title, CANDY.CRY.STINKER.HUG. Mural size drawings that reckoned with queerness, origin, genetics, identity and love lined the gallery. This work culminated most significantly in a monumental 2013 drawing retrospective at the Royal Hibernian Academy of Dublin, Ireland titled, Hard Keepers. These mural-sized drawings included gorillas, orangutans, chimpanzees signing and using language.  Others portray women loving and living with chimps and gorillas. The drawings of great apes and people probe the boundaries of how we define ourselves. Group 8 (Karisoke, The Virunga's, Rwanda. September 24, 1967. 4:30pm.) (2006) pictures a young woman, perhaps a primatologist, twined, enmeshed and eroticized with her favorite gorilla, while group 3 (Tanjung Putting, Borneo. 1971) (2007) shows a PhD candidate with the orangutan who nearly broke up her marriage. McCarty's work enters a topsy-turvy realm where love challenges all the boundaries between us, including how we define ourselves.  McCarty says, “I'm trying to go places where we don't comfortably always go” the work is difficult but it is meant to be difficult. For these mural cycles McCarty received the Pollock-Krasner grant.

In 2010 New York University’s 80WSE gallery presented the first major survey of Marlene McCarty's work, “i'm into you now: some work from 1980-2010,” an exhibition of painting, prints, and drawings. The catalogue included essays by Kathleen Hanna, former lead singer of Le Tigre and Bikini Kill, who writes, “Marlene's studio was wallpapered with the craziest fucking drawings I’ve ever seen. It looked like a coked up teenage girl decided to take the big pen drawings off her trapper keeper and magnifying them a thousand times they read like sexed up... paintings advertising a new cult I desperately wanted to join. They were big as billboards obsessive and completely unapologetic.

Into The Weeds 

McCarty's most recent works turn to plants to affirm ways to not only survive but thrive in toxic conditions.

Into The Weeds was first presented at UB Art Gallery, Center for the Arts, Buffalo USA, where a large-scale drawing installation was accompanied by an installation of seedlings under grow lights, and a large mound of soil that was home to a variety of potent plants.  Mugwort, [[Daucus carota
| Queen Anne's lace]], and jimson weed are a few of the plants that are both subject and material in Into The Weeds. At once poisonous and healing McCarty centers plants that have historically been used by women to maintain their sexual and reproductive health. Mugwort, for instance, promotes menstruation and can be used to induce abortion and regulate hormonal changes during menopause. The majority of the plants are wild, considered to be weeds they can be found anywhere from parking lots to forests.

The drawings ruminate on masculinity, capitalism, whiteness, and their inherent toxicities.  Layering and merging unruly poisonous flowers with flesh and hair using graphite and ballpoint pen.  Alongside the installation McCarty includes newsprint pamphlets that identify the plants’ poisonous properties and medicinal uses as well as including the local history of the plants and area. By including local histories, this work is more accessible to viewers from varying demographics whose histories are not usually presented in a fine art context.

To extend the project outside of the gallery walls, McCarty created a public garden of poisonous plants with the support of UB Arts Collaboratory and Silo City. 45 feet in diameter this is McCarty's first living earthwork. The garden is under Silo City's long-term stewardship and the care of ecologist Josh Smith.

Kunsthaus Baselland Switzerland 2020 similarly had an installation of large-scale drawings alongside an indoor garden of powerful plants with a germination table where plants grew during the extended length of the exhibition. The third installation of this work is currently on display at Last Tango, Zurich Switzerland.

Can I Borrow Your Hole at Last Tango Zurich Switzerland 11 Sep – 19 Dec 2020 

The works in Can I Borrow Your Hole at Last Tango were produced during the COVID-19 pandemic at the time of the first major Black Lives Matter protests. The works contain some of the first small drawings that McCarty has done as shipping large work was not possible due to the global lockdown. The drawings are installed on placards designed to highlight the power of taking to the streets to demand institutional change. The placards make the drawings both interventionist and immersive. The titles reintroduce McCarty's earlier work with text. Using homonyms McCarty plays with the meaning of language imbuing the work with a complex layering playing with the contradictions found in society touching upon the deep political chaos and divisiveness of present-day America as well as the care and collective activism witnessed in the response to the tumultuous times.

Permanent collections
McCarty's work can be found in the collections of the Brooklyn Museum, the Rubell Museum, the Queens Museum, Contemporary Art Museum, Houston, the Smith College Museum of Art, the Berkeley Art Museum and the Nasher Museum of Art. The permanent garden Into The Weeds is open to the public in Buffalo Silo City.

References 

American artists
American activists
University of Cincinnati alumni
1957 births
Living people
HIV/AIDS activists
American lesbian artists
LGBT people from Kentucky
People from Lexington, Kentucky